Capitol Peak is a high and prominent mountain summit in the Elk Mountains range of the Rocky Mountains of North America. It is the 52nd highest mountain in North America.

Mountain

Capitol Peak lies on the long ridge connecting the heart of the Elk Mountains with Mount Sopris to the northwest. Capitol Peak is notable for its impressive vertical relief, rising 7500 feet above the Roaring Fork Valley. Additionally, it rises nearly 6000 feet above Snowmass Village in just under 9 miles.

Capitol Peak is one of the most difficult of Colorado's fourteeners to climb.  The only non-technical route, the Northeast Ridge, requires crossing the famously exposed "Knife Edge," the northeast ridge of Capitol. Fatalities have occurred on this route. Other routes require technical rock climbing, for example, the Northwest Buttress Route (Grade IV, Class 5.9). These routes have significant rockfall danger due to a great deal of loose rock; however, the rock is substantially more solid than on the more famous Maroon Bells or on Pyramid Peak.

Capitol Peak Trail 
Capitol Peak is a 15.1 mile lightly trafficked out and back trail located near Snowmass Village, Colorado that features a lake and is only recommended for very experienced adventurers. The trail is primarily used for hiking, rock climbing, and backpacking and is best used from July until September. Dogs are also able to use this trail.

From the parking lot, hikers will hike 5.7 miles before arriving at the Capitol Peak campsite. Another 1.9 Miles is hiked to K2 and the summit. K2 is a peak that is often confused by hikers as the Capitol Peak summit.

Camping 
There is primitive camping near trail head in a designated site. No fee is required, but restrictions may exist.

Daly Pass 
At the trail head, at an altitude of 9,400 feet, following several switchbacks for half a mile will lead you to Daly Pass. Daly Pass is the first point of interest on Capitol Peak. This pass is recognized for its saddle-shaped ridge reaching 12,480 feet. After the pass, there is no more easy hiking till the summit.

K2 

K2 is known for often being confused by hikers with the Capitol Peak summit. Most hikers will go around the right side where it is most exposed.

Knife Edge 
Knife edge (pictured right) is famous for its 150-foot length, with 2,000 foot drops on both sides. Daredevils will walk across it in a timely manner, but other hikers may scooch across it like straddling a horse. It is regarded as the crux of the route due to the exposure.

Summit 
The view from Capitol Peak's summit includes Pierre Lakes in the huge cirque to the east. To the south is Snowmass Mountain, another Fourteener, at the end of a long shattered ridge. Farther to the east are red-striated peaks, including the Maroon Bells, Pyramid Peak, and Castle Peak. The long ridge of the Continental Divide is to the east.

Climate

Historical names 

 Capital Peak
Capitol Peak - by Hayden Survey who thought it looked similar to the U.S. Capitol building

See also

List of mountain peaks of North America
List of mountain peaks of the United States
List of mountain peaks of Colorado
List of Colorado fourteeners

References

Further reading
 
 
https://www.summitpost.org/capitol-peak/150528

External links
 
 Capitol Peak Peak Trip Report from Mountainouswords.com
Photo Journal of a trip up Snowmass Mountain and Capitol Peak
Video - Hiking the North East Ridge from the trailhead
 
 

Mountains of Colorado
Mountains of Pitkin County, Colorado
White River National Forest
Fourteeners of Colorado
North American 4000 m summits